"Let It Go" is a song recorded by American country music artist George Strait. Strait co-wrote it with his son Bubba Strait and Keith Gattis. It was released April 20, 2015, as the lead-off single from his 28th studio album Cold Beer Conversation.

Critical reception
Taste of Country gave the song a positive review, stating that the song "works to sever all emotional ties that often leave one bound up and anxious" and that Strait's "mellow voice serves this easy-to-embrace country song well." He also favorably compared it to Strait's own "The Seashores of Old Mexico" and Kenny Chesney songs from the early 2000s.

Chart performance

References

External links

2015 singles
George Strait songs
Songs written by George Strait
Songs written by Keith Gattis
Song recordings produced by Chuck Ainlay
MCA Nashville Records singles
2015 songs
MCA Records singles